Martin Šustr (3 October 1990 – 18 May 2022) was a Czech professional footballer who played as a goalkeeper.

Career
In January 2017, Šustr moved to Baník Ostrava. On 15 March 2019, he then joined MFK Vyškov.

Having played 14 games for the club, he left in the summer and signed with SK Líšeň on 14 July 2019. In January 2020, he then joined FC Zbrojovka Brno.

Šustr died in a car accident on 18 May 2022, at the age of 31.

References

External links
 Guardian Football
 

1990 births
2022 deaths
People from Boskovice
Road incident deaths in the Czech Republic
Truck road incident deaths
Czech footballers
Association football goalkeepers
Czech First League players
Czech National Football League players
SK Sigma Olomouc players
1. SC Znojmo players
SK Hanácká Slavia Kroměříž players
FC Baník Ostrava players
FC Zbrojovka Brno players
SK Líšeň players
MFK Vítkovice players
MFK Vyškov players
Sportspeople from the South Moravian Region